Paul C. Saville (born 1956) is an American businessman, and President and CEO of NVR, Inc.

Education
In 1977 he received a Bachelor of Arts degree in business administration (BBA) from the College of William and Mary.
He received a master of business administration (MBA) from the University of Pittsburgh.

Career
After receiving his M.B.A. from the University of Pittsburgh, Saville joined Rockwell International in their Automotive Operations. In 1989, Saville joined Ryan Homes, predecessor of NVR, working in various financial positions within the company. His backgrounds in finance and strategic planning/oversight prepared him to serve as Vice President of Business Planning, then CFO and effectively chief operating officer. He advanced within the company and in 2005 was appointed to his current position as President and CEO.

Saville earned more than $30 million in 2010 and owns about 300,000 shares of NVR stock. He has a net worth $230 million.

On August 8th, 2019, Saville traded 20,000 units of NVR stock worth more than $14,060,000. As of 7 May 2022, he has been trading around 1,349 units every 41 days since 2002.

References

1956 births
Living people
20th-century American businesspeople
21st-century American businesspeople
American chief executives
American real estate businesspeople
College of William & Mary alumni
Joseph M. Katz Graduate School of Business alumni